Eriochilus tenuis, commonly known as the slender bunny orchid, is a plant in the orchid family Orchidaceae and is endemic to Western Australia. It has a single egg-shaped leaf lying flat on the ground and one or two small pink or pink and white flowers. A common species, it grows in dense, shrubby forest and in winter-wet swamps.

Description
Flowering occurs from September to November, more prolifically after fire the previous summer.

Taxonomy and naming
Eriochilus tenuis was first formally described in 1840 by John Lindley and the description was published in A Sketch of the Vegetation of the Swan River Colony. The specific epithet (tenuis) is a Latin word meaning "thin", referring to the thin form of this orchid.

Distribution and habitat
The slender bunny orchid grows in winter-wet swamps and in moss beds on granite outcrops between Perth and Albany.

Conservation
Eriochilus tenuis is classified as "not threatened" by the Western Australian Government Department of Parks and Wildlife.

References

tenuis
Orchids of Western Australia
Endemic orchids of Australia
Plants described in 1840
Endemic flora of Western Australia